Rubén López (born 28 November 1990) is a Spanish gymnast. He competed at the 2012 Summer Olympics.  He also competed at five World Championships (2011, 2014, 2015, 2017 and 2018).

He began gymnastic training at the age of seven, training at the Granollers Club.  He was interested in the sport due to watching the performances of Li Xiaopeng at the 2000 Summer Olympics.

References

External links
 

1990 births
Living people
Spanish male artistic gymnasts
Olympic gymnasts of Spain
Gymnasts at the 2012 Summer Olympics
Gymnasts from Barcelona